The 1995–96 NCAA Division II men's ice hockey season began in October 1995 and concluded on March 9 of the following year. This was the 24th season of second-tier college ice hockey.

Alabama–Huntsville became the first undefeated champion since Bemidji State in 1984.

Regular season

Standings

Note: the records of teams who were members of Division III conferences during the season can be found here.

1996 NCAA Tournament

Note: * denotes overtime period(s)Note: Mini-games in italics

See also
 1995–96 NCAA Division I men's ice hockey season
 1995–96 NCAA Division III men's ice hockey season

References

External links

 
NCAA